Dark Chocolate is an Indian Bengali Crime thriller film directed by Agnidev Chatterjee and made under Macneill Engineering studio.

The film is adaption of real life murder of Sheena Bora, daughter of media barons Indrani Mukherjea and Peter Mukherjea. Bollywood actress Mahima Chaudhry made her debut in a Bengali film and played the role of Ishani Banerjee, a character based on murder accused Indrani Mukherjea. Riya Sen plays the part of Rina Bardhan, a role inspired by life of Sheena Bora. Media baron Peter Mukherjea is portrayed by Sudeep Mukherjee.

Cast 
 Mahima Chaudhry as Ishani Banerjee
 Riya Sen as Rina Bardhan/ young Ishani
 Mumtaz Sorcar as Payal Mukherjee
 Indrashis Roy as Abhishekh Chatterjee, Police Investigating Officer
 Sudip Mukherjee as Victor Banerjee, Ishani's husband
 Kaushik Sen as Goutam Das
 Shataf Figar as Shadab Kapoor 
 Rajesh Sharma as Ramcharan, driver
 Rick Basu as Lio, Reena's brother
 Sumomto Mukhopadhyay as Ishani's step-father
 Joy Bodlani as Police Commissioner
 Supriya Talukdar as Ishani's mother
 Parijat Chakraborty as Banerjee's family friend
 Debopriyo Mukherjee as Rohit Banerjee, Victor's son
 Christal as Niti
 Manasi Sengupta as Manashi
 Lubna Mahmood as Elina
 Gourav Churiwal as Vikram Singha
 Nityodhon Ganguly as hotel receptionist
 Romit Roy as Debashis
 Saurav Ghosh as Bibhas
 Saubhik Majumdar as TV anchor
 Tathagato Banerjee as contract killer
 Suparna Dey as contract killer's wife
 Shibnath Acharya as man in the bar

Also as CBI officers in the cast include Priyanka Dey, Monali Sengupta, Puja Karmakar, Rohit Kumar and Utpal Dutta

References

External links 
 

Bengali-language Indian films
2010s Bengali-language films
2016 films
Indian detective films
Indian crime thriller films
2016 crime thriller films